Tyolyoy-Diring (Tölöy-Diriŋ, Diriŋ) is a rural locality (a selo) and the administrative center of Tyolyoysky Rural Okrug in Churapchinsky District of the Sakha Republic, Russia, located  from Churapcha, the administrative center of the district. Its population as of the 2010 Census was 506; up from 399 recorded in the 2002 Census.

References

Notes

Sources
Official website of the Sakha Republic. Registry of the Administrative-Territorial Divisions of the Sakha Republic. Churapchinsky District. 

Rural localities in Churapchinsky District